201 was a year of the Julian calendar, in the third century AD.

201 may also refer to:

 201 (number), the natural number following 200 and preceding 202
 201 BC, a year of the pre-Julian Roman calendar
 "201" (South Park), an episode of the American adult animated sitcom
 201 (area code), used for telephone numbers in New Jersey, USA
 201 (MBTA bus), a bus route in Boston, Massachusetts, USA
 IT-201, a New York (state) tax form.
 Event 201, a pandemic exercise